Navantha Rathnayake (born 9 February 1979) is a Sri Lankan cricketer. He made his first-class debut for Sri Lanka Army Sports Club in the 2006–07 Premier Trophy on 17 November 2006.

References

External links
 

1979 births
Living people
Sri Lankan cricketers
Sri Lanka Army Sports Club cricketers
Place of birth missing (living people)